Alexys is a given name. Notable people with the name include:

Alexys Brunel (born 1998), French cyclist
Alexys Nycole Sanchez (born 2003), American actress

See also
 Alexy
 Aleksis
 Aleksy
 Alexey
 Alexis (disambiguation)